Mike Schatz (born March 28, 1952) is an American politician. He is a member of the North Dakota House of Representatives from the 36th District, serving since 2008. He is a member of the Republican party.  Schatz also served in the House from 1988 to 1990.

References

Living people
1952 births
Republican Party members of the North Dakota House of Representatives
21st-century American politicians